Stanley Cortez, A.S.C. (November 4, 1908 – December 23, 1997) was an American cinematographer. The younger brother of actor and director Ricardo Cortez, Stanley worked on over 70 films, including Orson Welles' The Magnificent Ambersons (1942), Charles Laughton's The Night of the Hunter (1955), Nunnally Johnson's The Three Faces of Eve (1957), and Samuel Fuller's Shock Corridor (1963) and The Naked Kiss (1964).

Biography
Cortez was born under the surname "Krantz" in New York City and attended New York University. He adopted his professional name Cortez to capitalize on the fame of his older brother, Jacob Krantz, who had been transformed into the film matinee idol Ricardo Cortez. He first worked as a designer of elegant sets for several portrait photographers' studios (including that of Edward Steichen), which may well have instilled in him his great talent: a strong feeling for space and an ability to move his camera through that space in such a way as to embody it in film's two-dimensional format. His first job in the film industry was for Pathé News, which later allowed him to give his films a newsreel-like touch when necessary. During the 1920s and the early 1930s, he worked his way up the usual Hollywood cameraman ladder: camera assistant, camera operator, and cinematographer (or first cameraman, a rank he attained in 1936). He managed to work for some of the great Hollywood cameramen, among them Karl Struss, Charles Rosher, and Arthur C. Miller. On the side, Cortez managed to do an experimental film, Scherzo (1932), that drew on the techniques of Slavko Vorkapić; critics have referred to this short as a "symphony of light."

Cortez's early films as cinematographer are not of the first rank, but they often had offbeat subjects that allowed him to experiment. (indeed, throughout his career, he displayed an ability to give otherwise mediocre works a certain interest by means of experimental techniques.) In The Forgotten Woman (1939) he did an extreme close-up of the actress's eyes to create a sense of seeing into her mind. Then Cortez had his big chance of working with Orson Welles on The Magnificent Ambersons (1942). Cortez saw the set for the film before being appointed first cameraman. His spatial sense told him that shooting the film within these sets would be a tremendous challenge. Welles intuited that Cortez's mastery of studio space was exactly what this film–having a house as its main setting–demanded. Much of Cortez's work on the film was cut by the studio. During World War II, Cortez served in the United States Army Signal Corps.

In his later years, Cortez filmed several psychological dramas. In Smash-Up, the Story of a Woman (1947), Cortez used flashing lights placed inside the camera to create the sense of drunkenness. Charles Laughton gave Cortez another challenge – The Night of the Hunter. The extraordinary film demanded trial underwater shots and expressionistically lit sets, and Cortez managed to endow the camera movements with a musical quality. In The Three Faces of Eve (1957), Cortez found his actress: Joanne Woodward would be to him what Greta Garbo was to William H. Daniels and Marlene Dietrich to Lee Garmes. Cortez's subtle modulations of lighting match Woodward's equally subtle changes of expression, and both together create the sense of Eve, a psychologically split personality, becoming someone else. In Samuel Fuller's 1963 film Shock Corridor, the labyrinthine hallways and rooms of the studio set are transformed by Cortez's camera into a symbol of incarceration and insanity.

Cortez started Chinatown (1974), but director Roman Polanski replaced him after a few days shooting due to a disagreement over visual style. He was replaced by John Alonzo.

Cortez died in 1997 of a heart attack, and is buried in Mount Sinai Memorial Park Cemetery.

Selected filmography

 The Black Cat (1941)
 The Magnificent Ambersons (1942)
 Flesh and Fantasy (1943)
 Since You Went Away (1944)
 Smash-Up, the Story of a Woman (1947)
 Secret Beyond the Door (1948)
 The Man on the Eiffel Tower (1950)
 The Underworld Story (1950)
 Abbott and Costello Meet Captain Kidd (1952)
 The Night of the Hunter (1955)
 Man from Del Rio (1956)
 The Three Faces of Eve (1957)
 Shock Corridor (1963) 
 The Naked Kiss (1964) 
 The Candidate (1964) 
 Young Dillinger (1965)
 They Saved Hitler's Brain (1963, additional sequences shot in 1968)

References
"Stanley Cortez." International Dictionary of Films and Filmmakers, Volume 4: Writers and Production Artists, 4th ed. St. James Press, 2000.

External links

 Grave

1908 births
1997 deaths
American cinematographers
American people of Austrian-Jewish descent
Jewish American artists
Artists from New York City
New York University alumni
Burials at Mount Sinai Memorial Park Cemetery
20th-century American Jews